The Kamiriithu Community Education and Cultural Centre, in Kamiriithu, Kenya was a center and program formed in 1976 by efforts from Ngũgĩ wa Thiong'o, scholars from the University of Nairobi, and locals from the Kamiriithu village community. The center was especially focused around theatre, through a multitude of self-contained programs geared towards different community groups. The participants came from a variety of different classes, but were predominantly made up of the local peasant class.

The goal of the center was to reconnect to Kenyan traditions and African theatre. This was facilitated by the performance of shows in Gikuyu, as well as staging drama and musical productions that featured song, dance, and mimes. The center was most famous for its production of Ngaahika Ndeenda (I Will Marry When I Want) co-written by Ngũgĩ wa Thiong'o and Ngugi wa Mirii in collaboration with community members of Kamiriithu and directed by Dr. Kimani Gecau. The production premiered on October 2, 1977, and took place in an open-air theater at Kamiriithu, housing an audience of at least 10,000 people.

Due to the play's critique of justice for Kenyan people within society and the massive attendance of the production, the Kenyan government banned the center from holding any public gatherings. This made it impossible for the center to continue performing Ngaahika Ndeenda. Ngugi wa Thiong'o was later arrested on December 31, 1977, for being a potential political threat to the Kenyan government at the time. However, even after the government interventions, the Kamiriithu Community Center continued its trajectory by beginning on a production of Maitu Njugira (Mother Sing for Me) which was co-directed by Dr. Kimani Gecau and Waigwa Wachiira and set to premiere at the Kenyan National Theatre on February 19, 1982. The government withdrew the center's license for public performance in November 1977 and banned all theatre activities at the Kamiriithu Community Education and Cultural Centre (and neighboring areas) on March 11, 1982.

On March 12, 1982, three truckloads of armed police arrived at the Kamiriithu Community Education and Cultural Centre and razed their open-aired theatre to the ground.

See also  
Ngaahika Ndeenda

References 
Decolonising the Mind (Ch. 2), Ngugi Wa Thiong'o

Education in Central Province (Kenya)